Pyo Ji-hoon (born February 2, 1993), better known by his stage name P.O, is a South Korean rapper, singer and actor. He is the youngest member of the boy group Block B and its sub-unit Bastarz.

Early life and education
P.O was born Pyo Ji-hoon on February 2, 1993, in Seoul, South Korea. He attended Hanlim Multi Art School, graduating in 2012.

Career

Pre-debut
P.O got acting lessons in elementary school and entered Hanlim Multi Art School to chase after his original dream of becoming an actor. He then fell in love with Hip hop together with his bestfriend Mino. He decided to rejoin Stardom Entertainment, after they kicked him out previously before he lost weight and ignored offers from other Agencies, to debut with Block B.

2011–2012: Debut and hospitalization
P.O debuted with Block B in April 2011. In February 2012, the band received heavy criticism for their disrespectful behavior during an interview in Thailand, particularly jokes regarding about the previous year's flooding disaster. P.O reportedly fainted and was hospitalized for shock on February 24, after learning of a petition calling for the members to apologize by committing suicide.

To show his gratitude to BBC (Block B Club), Block B's official fanbase, P.O released a song written especially for them. "Dear My Wife" was released into his cyworld on September 25, featuring (previously part of BoM's) Winner's Mino.

Along with fellow Block B member, Zico, they both were chosen as MCs for SBS MTV's The Show. During a November 2012 episode of Weekly Idol, P.O stated that he came from a wealthy family background, explaining that his father runs a duty-free store.

2013–2014: Bigboi is Ready 2 Showtime and collaborations
On March 9, P.O released the first song "Amino Acid" from his Mixtape Bigboi is Ready 2 Showtime, featuring Winner's Mino. He continued releasing songs each day until March 21. Rookie girl group Delight featured P.O in their song "Mega-Yak". In September 2013, P.O starred in Kye Bum-zu's "Something Special" music video alongside Hello Venus's Yoon-jo.

In 2014, P.O was featured in the digital single "It's not a Big Deal" by V.O.S's Kim Kyung Rok, released January 6. P.O also co-wrote the lyrics for the title track of the SBS drama Secret Door, which was performed by Block B and released September 22.

2015: Bastarz
On April 5, it was announced that P.O would participate in Block B's first sub-unit, Bastarz, along with members U-Kwon and B-Bomb. The sub-unit's album was released April 13, along with a video for the title track, "Zero for Conduct," and it debuted at No. 3 on the Gaon album chart.

P.O was significantly involved with the creation of the Bastarz album, receiving a lyrics credit for "Zero for Conduct," sole lyrics credit and a composition credit for "Charlie Chaplin," a lyrics credit for "Thief," and a lyrics and composition credit for "Sue Me," which he performed along with the rapper Incredivle.

On May 23, P.O appeared with fellow Block B member Taeil on the KBS show Immortal Songs 2, where they performed a remake of the song "I Don't Know Why" by Kim Soo-chul. P.O featured in Kye Bum Zu's "Give It 2 U," which was released in late July.

Bastarz released a Japanese version of "Conduct Zero" in October; the CD single containing the song reached No. 20 on the Oricon weekly chart.

2016: Theatrical debut and Bastarz comeback
In February, P.O appeared in the theatrical play Superman.com, which he also helped write and produce as part of a new theatrical troupe, Company Boy (극단 소년).

In October, Block B announced that the Bastarz sub-unit would be having a comeback featuring a lead single composed by P.O, which was released October 24. The sub-unit's second mini-album, Welcome to BASTARZ, was released October 31; P.O received lyrics credits for all five songs on the album, and composition credits for three.

Also in October, the OnStyle network announced that P.O and fellow Block B member U-Kwon would be on the new show Lipstick Prince. The first season aired from December 1, 2016, to February 16, 2017.

2017: Variety and Drama Shows, Solo Debut
P.O was cast in Living Together in Empty Room, a special variety show broadcast on MBC for the Korean New Year in three episodes from January 26 to 27, 2017. In the course of the show, two women, trot singer Hong Jin-young and comedian Kim Shin-young, moved into P.O's house. The show ranked No. 1 among New Year's specials. In March it was reported that the show would be picked up and aired as a series, and that P.O would be among the cast members.

In addition, P.O was cast as an MC for the cooking variety show Strange Restaurant, which premiered on the O'live television channel March 13. P.O hosted the show, in which guests attempted to cook dishes they have ordered, along with Kim Jong-min, Kim Yong-man, and Seo Jang-hoon.

P.O also appeared in the second season of Lipstick Prince, which premiered March 30.

On April 5, it was announced that P.O had been cast in the upcoming drama "Our First Romance," starring Lee Jong-hyun and Lee Yu-bi, and written by Go Sun Hee, who also wrote the tvN drama Cheese in the Trap. Later that month, it was reported that P.O had been cast on a pilot MBC variety show called Secret Variety Institute.

In May, it was announced that P.O would be an MC for the SBS MTV music program The Show, along with Jeonghwa of EXID and Yeonwoo of Momoland. P.O appeared in a second play by the Company Boy troupe, Manitoz, which ran from June 17 to 25. Also in June, he and fellow group member U-Kwon received the Maxim K-Model Icon Idol Award. In July, it was reported that P.O had been cast in the SBS drama Temperature of Love, which began airing in September. The show's debut episode had the highest ratings in its time slot.

P.O took part in the Japanese special project album, Block B: Project-1, released September 20, performing the song "Winner" along with fellow Block B member U-Kwon and Japanese rapper Chanmina.

On September 19, it was announced that P.O would make his solo debut. His song, the funk tune "Men'z Night," was released September 27 and featured the singer Chancellor.

In December, P.O took part in a tribute album for the late singer Yoo Jae-ha to commemorate the 30th anniversary of his debut.

2018–present: Variety success and solo projects

In spring of 2018, P.O appeared again as a cast member on Living Together in Empty Room, living with stylist Han Hye-yeon and Jinyoung of Got7. In addition, the Company Boy troupe staged another production of Superman.com in which P.O starred. Later in the year, he became a regular cast member for Great Escape and New Journey to the West 5/6.

In addition to his work on variety shows, in 2018 P.O acted in two dramas, Encounter (broadcast by tvN) and Love Alert (broadcast by MBN).

P.O released a new song, "Comme des Garçons," on November 11, 2018. The song features a funky sound and personal lyrics that discuss P.O's life from before his debut to the present.

During the broadcast of the last episode of New Journey to the West 6 on December 2, 2018, it was announced that P.O would be joining the upcoming second season of Kang's Kitchen.

In February 2019, it was announced that P.O would star in a new theatrical production by the Company Boy troupe, a live version of the 2005 film Boy Goes to Heaven scheduled to run from February 16 to March 3.

In November 2019, it was revealed that P.O would act as master of ceremony for the upcoming MBC Entertainment Awards, along with Hwasa of Mamamoo and Jun Hyun-moo.

In December 2020, P.O starred in another Company Boy theatrical production, the play Almost, Maine. P.O played the characters of Randy and Dave in the production, which ran from December 25, 2020, to February 14, 2021. P.O also starred in the play's Busan production, which took place in June 2021.

In September 2021, P.O's label, Seven Seasons, announced that he would not be renewing his contract with them at the end of the month.

On October 29, 2021, P.O officially signed with Artist Company.

On February 10, 2022, it was reported that P.O would be recording his last show Amazing Saturday in March, three days before his military service.

Personal life

Mental health 
In February 24, 2012, P.O (real name Pyo Ji-hoon) was diagnosed with "stress-induced schizophrenia" shortly after being hospitalized for fainting. Though his uncle Pyo Jin-in would later dispute the accuracy of the diagnosis on his Twitter account. Jin-in criticized it for its vagueness, and the fact that it was given quickly. He cited that symptoms might have arisen due to SPD, schizoaffective disorder, brief psychotic disorder or PTSD and they would have been shown for at least six months if it were to match those of schizophrenia.

Military service 
P.O enlisted in the Republic of Korea Marine Corps on March 28, 2022. Later in June 2022, the agency said that P.O. had just been assigned to the Marine Corps headquarters in Hwaseong, Gyeonggi-do and was planning to serve in a military band. Previously, he has postponed his military service until December 2021 to focus on broadcasting and acting.

Discography

Singles

Filmography

Film

Variety shows

Television series

Web series

Radio show

Hosting

Theater

Awards and nominations

References

External links

1993 births
Living people
People with schizophrenia
South Korean male rappers
South Korean male pop singers
South Korean male idols
Hanlim Multi Art School alumni
Dong-ah Institute of Media and Arts alumni
Block B members
KQ Entertainment artists
Pyo clan
Rappers from Seoul
South Korean hip hop record producers
South Korean television personalities
Republic of Korea Marine Corps personnel